Brütting is a German shoe manufacturer, located in Küps, Bavaria. GEKA Sport Limited is a division of Brütting.

History 

1946
Brütting was founded by shoe modeler Eugen Brütting in 1946, when he opened his first shoe factory in Nuremberg.

1952
He produced high fashion women shoes under the name Maestro Eugenio and had a number of patents which were used by Rudolf Dassler.

1965
He quarreled with Dassler and set up his own sports section. As the demand for high fashion shoes is very seasonal, his company had surplus capacity four times every year. He set up EB-Sport-International as a separate company, which focused on the track and field athletes. At first imported track suits, and other equipment from France (Trévoir) to have the full range loke hs competitors. His plan for special shoes for different types of sports gained in popularity. The scheme ranged from shoes for fencers, weightlifters, and boxers to wrestlers and runners.

1966
Arnd Krüger was the first German (indoor) champion in Brütting racing spikes.

1968
In the amateur years he convinced athletes to change by providing individually hand-crafted shoes. Women athletes were also given free high fashion women's shoes. Among the most famous wearers were Liesel Westermann, winner of the silver medal at the 1968 Summer Olympics in the discus throw, and Bernd Kannenberg, winner of the gold medal in 50 km race walking and Peter Mueller, German box champion at that time.

1970
Along with athletics coach Arthur Lydiard and various other athletes, ‘Roadrunner’, a running shoe, was developed by Eugen Brütting in 1970. Due to its characteristic lasts, the  ‘Roadrunner’, enjoyed an excellent reputation among the runners of that time. The ‘Siesta’, a recreational shoe, which was based on the ‘Roadrunner’, was known for its adjusting to individual feet.

1972
Günter Zahn who was selected as final runner of the Olympic torch relay in Munich 1972 was not permitted to wear his Bruetting shoes, Adidas was a major sponsor of the German Olympic Committee. Bruetting recognized the growing market for tennis equipment and launched a new line for tennis trainers.

In the meantime, Gerhard Krapp had founded ‘GEKA-Sport Limited’ in 1973, which was a competitor for Brütting Limited. In September 1984, Bernhard Meyer was appointed the second executive director of Brütting. In conjunction with Krapp, they took over Brütting Limited in the mid-80s. Renamed as ‘EB-Sport Schuh-Vertrieb GmbH’, the shoe production was continued. 

1984
Brütting worked from 1984 onwards as a modeler and business consultant for the company until his death in 1991. In that year the company was renamed and has been called since then ‘Brütting & Co.EB-Sport Int. GmbH’.

2002
In 2002, Gerhard Krapp retired and Bernhard Meyer became the owner of ‘Brütting Limited’. 

2007
After years of expansion, Brütting introduced ‘EB-Kids’, a new brand which displaced the Brütting’s “Maus”-collection in the children's shoe division. Bernhard Meyer was succeeded by Tobias Dormann as executive director, although he continues to serve as a consultant.

Products 
Their best-selling shoe is the 'Roadrunner' model, followed by 'Astroturfer‘, 'Marathon‘, and 'Multiplex‘, which are still being hand-crafted in Germany. Besides the hand-crafted shoes, Bruetting is producing shoes in the following markets:

 Running
 Indoor
 Fashion
 Wellness
 Over-size
 Kid’s shoes
 Nordic Walking
 Trekking/Outdoor
 Tennis-Classic-Soccer

Quotes 
"From Roadrunner to Nike Air- Eugen Brütting and the Dassler brothers were the pioneers".
"For almost a decade, the complete running elite were walking in Brüttings […] From Franz-Josef Kemper, Manfred Steffny, Werner Gierke, Manfred Lötzerich, Hans-Jürgen Orthmann, Gerhard Weidner - and besides them thousands of others, each and every single one of them had a pair of Brütting’s on..."

References

External links
Official Website
Stockx Sneakers
Bst Replica Shoes

Shoe companies of Germany
Companies based in Bavaria
1946 establishments in Germany
Clothing companies established in 1946

de:Brütting (Sportartikelhersteller)